Abaza is a Northwest Caucasian language spoken by Abazins in Russia. The language has gone through several different orthographies based primarily on Latin, Russian, Roman, and Cyrillic letters. Its consonant-to-vowel ratio is remarkably high; making it quite similar to many other languages from the same parent chain. The language evolved in popularity in the mid to late 1800s, but has become an endangered language.

Abaza is spoken by approximately 35,000 people in Russia, where it is written in a Cyrillic alphabet, as well as another 10,000 in Turkey, where the Latin script is used.
It consists of two dialects, the Ashkherewa dialect and the T'ap'anta dialect, which is the literary standard. The language also consists of five sub dialects known as Psyzh-Krasnovostok, Abazakt, Apsua, Kubin-Elburgan and Kuvin.

Abaza, like its relatives in the family of Northwest Caucasian languages, is a highly agglutinative language. For example, the verb in the English sentence "He couldn't make them give it back to her" contains four arguments (a term used in valency grammar): he, them, it, to her. Abaza marks arguments morphologically, and incorporates all four arguments as pronominal prefixes on the verb.

It has a large consonantal inventory (63 phonemes) coupled with a minimal vowel inventory (two vowels). It is very closely related to Abkhaz, but it preserves a few phonemes which Abkhaz lacks, such as a voiced pharyngeal fricative. Work on Abaza has been carried out by W. S. Allen, Brian O'Herin, and John Colarusso.

History 
Different forms of cultural assimilation contributed to its fall in use in areas of Russia, and over time its overall endangerment. The language can be broken into 5 different dialects and has several unique grammatical approaches to languages. The Abaza language was at its peak usage in the mid to late 19th century.

Abaza speakers along the Greater and Lesser Laba, Urup, and Greater and Lesser Zelenchuk rivers are from a wave of migrants in the 17th to 18th centuries who represent the Abaza speakers of today. The end of the Great Caucasian War in 1864 provided Russia with power and control of the local regions and contributed to the decrease in the popularity of pre-existing local languages prior to the war.

The Abaza language wasn't a written language until the Latin alphabet was adopted in 1932–1933 to write it. The Cyrillic script was later utilized to write the language in 1938. A small amount of books, pamphlets, and a newspaper were published in the Abaza language afterwards.

Geographic distribution 
The Abaza language is spoken in Russia and Turkey. Although it is endangered, it is still spoken in several regions in Russia. These include Kara-Pago, Kubina, Psyzh, El'burgan, Inzhich-Chukun, Koi-dan, Abaza-Khabl', Malo-Abazinka, Tapanta, Krasnovostochni, Novokuvinski, Starokuvinski, Abazakt and Ap-sua.

Phonology 

Orthography 
Since 1938, Abaza has been written with the version of the Cyrillic alphabet shown below.

The digraphs Лӏ and Фӏ are dialectal, and are therefore absent from the literary language and the official alphabet.

Grammar

Notable speakers
Sultan Laguchev, a singer-songwriter famous in Russia, writes and performs songs in the Abaza language, including "Абыгъь гӏважьква" and "БаъапI бара." He has written an additional song in Russian entitled "Мы абазины" ('We are Abazins') about Abazinia.

References

Further reading
  
  
  
  
  
 Allen, W.S. Structure and system in the Abaza verbal complex. In: Transactions of the Philological Society (Hertford), Oxford, 1956, p. 127-176.
  
 O’Herin, B. Case and agreement in Abaza. Summer Institute of Linguistics, September 2002.

External links

 The first in the world Abaza–Russian and Russian–Abaza online dictionaries
 Abaza basic lexicon at the Global Lexicostatistical Database
 Recordings in Abaza language
 World Atlas of Language Structures information on Abaza
 Speak Abaza: past, present and future of the Abaza language - World Abaza Congress

 
Agglutinative languages
Definitely endangered languages
Northwest Caucasian languages
Languages of Russia
Languages of Turkey
Karachay-Cherkessia
Abazins
Endangered Caucasian languages
Vertical vowel systems
Languages written in Cyrillic script